Megascelidini is a tribe of leaf beetles in the subfamily Eumolpinae. It contains two genera, Megascelis and Mariamela, which are found in the New World. Historically, the group was classified as a separate subfamily.

References

Beetle tribes
Eumolpinae